The cuneiform sign for la (𒆷), and also in the Epic of Gilgamesh the sumerogram LA-(capital letter (majuscule), is a common-use sign for the Epic and for the 1350 BC Amarna letters. It is used for syllabic la, and also for alphabetic l, or a.

Epic of Gilgamesh use
In the Epic of Gilgamesh it used in the following numbers: la-(348), LA-(5) times.

Amarna letter usage

The Amarna letter usage of cuneiform la is common for the spelling of Akkadian language "lā", English language, "not", as it is composed of 'la-a'-(). It is also used infrequently for just 'la', for "not", (lā).

References

Moran, William L. 1987, 1992. The Amarna Letters. Johns Hopkins University Press, 1987, 1992. 393 pages.(softcover)
 Parpola, 1971. The Standard Babylonian Epic of Gilgamesh, Parpola, Simo, Neo-Assyrian Text Corpus Project, c 1997, Tablet I thru Tablet XII, Index of Names, Sign List, and Glossary-(pp. 119–145), 165 pages.

Cuneiform signs